Hermann Hirzel (1864–1939) was a Swiss painter. He studied for some years at the Academy of Arts, Berlin. He also lived in Italy and Sicily. Some of the works were presented at the Gurlitt's Winter Exhibitions. His etchings and drawings demonstrated his love of nature. Hirzel even branched out into doing commercial wrappers and covers for music.

References
This article was initially translated from the German Wikipedia.

19th-century Swiss painters
Swiss male painters
20th-century Swiss painters
1864 births
1939 deaths
19th-century Swiss male artists
20th-century Swiss male artists